Glanapteryx is a genus of catfishes native to South America.

Taxonomy 
Glanapteryx is a monophyletic genus. Glanapteryx has been proposed as the sister group to a clade composed of Pygidianops and Typhlobelus, with Listrura the sister group to those three.

Species
There are currently two recognized species in this genus:
 Glanapteryx anguilla Myers, 1927
 Glanapteryx niobium de Pinna, 1998

Distribution and habitat 
G. anguilla originates from the Negro and Orinoco River basins of Brazil and Venezuela, growing to a length of about 6.1 centimetres (2.4 in) TL. G. niobium reaches about 5.5 cm (2.2 in). These species lack an anal fin.

Glanapteryx anguilla has been found in small forest streams with sandy substrate covered by leaf litter.

References

Trichomycteridae
Fish of South America
Fish of Brazil
Fish of Venezuela
Freshwater fish genera
Catfish genera
Taxa named by George S. Myers